Dammika Perera (born 27 June 1979) is a Sri Lankan cricketer. He played 66 first-class and 49 List A matches for multiple domestic sides in Sri Lanka between 2001 and 2011. His last first-class match was for Burgher Recreation Club in the 2010–11 Premier Trophy on 8 March 2011.

See also
 List of Chilaw Marians Cricket Club players

References

External links
 

1979 births
Living people
Sri Lankan cricketers
Burgher Recreation Club cricketers
Chilaw Marians Cricket Club cricketers
Lankan Cricket Club cricketers
Sebastianites Cricket and Athletic Club cricketers
Cricketers from Colombo